Farington is a village and civil parish in the South Ribble local government district of Lancashire, England. The population of the civil parish at the 2011 census was 6,674.

History
The parish was part of Preston Rural District throughout its existence from 1894 to 1974. In 1974 the parish became part of South Ribble.

Farington railway station served the area from 1838 to 1960.

Governance
Farington is a civil parish in South Ribble district; with Lostock Hall and Tardy Gate it forms the district's Central area. It was also within the Parliamentary Constituency of South Ribble until the 2010 general election.  However, at the recommendation of the Boundary Commission, the area was moved into the Ribble Valley constituency.  The parish includes the villages of Farington and Farington Moss, and parts of Lostock Hall and Whitestake. Lancashire County Council's Farington electoral division comprises both Farington wards and Moss Side.

Geography
Situated to the immediate north of Leyland, Farington consists of villages, farms and mossland, modern residential development and an industrial area around the Leyland Trucks headquarters and assembly plant.

The relationship between Farington and Leyland has always been strong but Farington is not part of Leyland. Stanifield Lane which runs through the village and into Leyland is the main thoroughfare for shoppers and commuters alike. There is a Catholic convent in Farington, serving a moderately large Catholic population. Farington has a park that has been referred to as the home of football in South Ribble.

It is home to the main tip site for South Ribble, the Farington Household Waste Recycling Centre.

Economy
Leyland Trucks, with HQ and assembly plant in Farington, is a major employer in the area. The Central Lancashire Primary Care Trust has its head office in the area.  Enterprise plc, a provider of support services to the public sector and utility companies, was based in Farington but has been integrated into Amey plc, which moved from its offices there when the lease expired in 2014 There are few retail facilities in the centre of Farington, but retail parks and Leyland town centre are nearby.

See also

Listed buildings in Farington

References

External links

Farington Parish Council

Villages in Lancashire
Geography of South Ribble
Civil parishes in Lancashire